Chipping Ongar is a market town and former civil parish, now in the parish of Ongar, in the Epping Forest District of the county of Essex, England. In 2020 the built-up area had an estimated population of 6420. In 1961 the parish had a population of 1673.

Origin of the name
The name "Ongar" means "grass land" (akin to the German word Anger). "Chipping" is from Old English cēping, "a market, a market-place", akin to Danish "købing" and Swedish "köping"; the same element is found in other towns such as Chipping Norton, Chipping Sodbury, Chipping Barnet and Chipping (now High) Wycombe.

History
Ongar was an important market town in the Medieval era, at the centre of a hundred and has the remains of a Norman castle (see below). The Church of England parish church, St Martin's, dates from the 11th century and shows signs of Norman work. A small window in the chancel is believed to indicate the existence of an anchorite's cell in medieval times. The Gothic Revival architect C. C. Rolfe added the south aisle in 1884.

David Livingstone lived in Chipping Ongar on the High Street in 1838.

The civil parish of Chipping Ongar was abolished in 1965 when the new parish of Ongar was created, also incorporating the former area of the Greensted and Shelley civil parishes. The parish was part of Epping and Ongar Rural District until 1974 when it became part of the Epping Forest District.

Several of the small private-sector businesses that operated through to the closing decades of the 20th century have closed down or relocated as the economic focus of the region has been redirected, especially since the opening of the M11 motorway in the 1970s, to larger towns in west Essex, especially Harlow and Brentwood. Local planning policies have focused increasingly on residential development, and Ongar, like very many of the smaller towns in the green belt around London, can be viewed primarily as a dormitory town for commuters to London, Brentwood, Harlow and Chelmsford. However, the single-track railway branch line that connected Ongar to Epping (and thereby to London), operated by the London Underground, was closed in 1994. Ongar has a range of retail shops.

Jane Taylor, who wrote the words of "Twinkle Twinkle Little Star", is buried at the United Reformed Church in Ongar.

There is a memorial window to Father Thomas Byles in St Helen's Catholic Church.

Ongar Grammar School in Chipping Ongar, a private school for boys, was opened as a boarding school in 1811 by William Stokes M.A. By 1845 the school was known as 'Ongar Academy' (not connected to an academy school in the 21st-century sense). It was a private grammar school by 1874, Chignell Grammar School by 1882, and was closed in 1940, before the introduction of secondary education under the Education Act 1944 and the Tripartite System.

RAF Chipping Ongar (also known as Willingale) is a former World War II airfield. The airfield is approximately 2 miles (3.2 km) northeast of Chipping Ongar. Opened in 1943, it was used by both the Royal Air Force and United States Army Air Forces. During the War it was used primarily as a bomber airfield. It was closed in 1959 after many years as a reserve airfield.

Education
Chipping Ongar Infant School, originally housed in Victorian school buildings off the High Street (behind Budworth Hall on the site of today's Sainsbury's), was re-located in the mid-1980s, merging with Chipping Ongar Junior School at Greensted Road, at the southern edge of the town, forming Chipping Ongar Primary School. A further primary school, Ongar Primary School, is beyond the northern end of Chipping Ongar in Shelley. Also within Shelley is The Ongar Academy, providing secondary education for Ongar.

Geography
Chipping Ongar is at the convergence of several old roads, between Chelmsford and Epping on an east–west axis and between Dunmow and Chigwell (beyond which is London) on a north–south axis.  To the southeast lies Brentwood, on the old road to the former River Thames ferry crossing at Tilbury, though the building in the 1970s of the M11 and M25 motorways means that Ongar is no longer directly on a principal route for petrol tankers (and other less prominent vehicles) travelling from the current Dartford Crossing and the Thames Estuary oil refineries.

The civil parish of Ongar, which has a town council, includes from north-to-south Shelley, Chipping Ongar and Marden Ash, with Greensted to the southwest.

The central part of Ongar High Street comprises a widened main street of the type found in many older English towns whose status as market towns is believed to have originated during the (little chronicled) Saxon period. This historic thoroughfare is lined with over 70 listed buildings and protected by the Chipping Ongar Conservation Area, one of the first to be designated by Essex County Council nearly 50 years ago. The wide high street is used to permit some 'no charge' short-term parking that benefits the local shops.  The high street does, however, retain a very narrow stretch, with shops and houses either side very close to the road due to pavements that are barely adequate for two people to pass each other.

Much of the surrounding countryside is occupied by large mechanised farms devoted, for the most part, to arable agriculture.  During the 20th century the proximity of London encouraged dairy farming, but the 1960s, 1970s and 1980s were characterised by the removal of hedges and an increase in average field sizes as cattle numbers diminished. This policy was gradually reversed from the 1990s with schemes to replant hedges and trees. The subsoil is of heavy clay, rendering the land too soggy in winter for sheep.

Ongar Castle

Ongar Castle is a good example of a late 11th- or early 12th-century motte and bailey, although only the earthworks survive. The motte or mound is about 70 metres in diameter at the base and is surrounded by a wet ditch up to 15 metres wide. A kidney-shaped inner bailey is to the west of the motte and there is a second bailey to the east. The remains of a town enclosure embankment extend to the west.

The castle may have been built by Eustace II, Count of Boulogne, who obtained the manor of Ongar in 1086. It was visited by King Henry II in 1157, when it was held by Richard de Lucy. A stone keep was built on top of the motte, but this was pulled down in the 16th century and replaced by a brick building, itself destroyed in the 18th century. The motte itself is now covered with trees and is in private ownership, but can be seen from a public footpath that starts at the north end of the High Street.

Transport

Road
The A414 runs from Chelmsford, through Ongar, to Harlow.

Parking restrictions operate throughout the town centre where a 20-minute no-return 2-hour scheme applies. Three pay-and-display car parks are available with a total 530 capacity.

Local residents have previously called for lowering of the current national speed limit between The Mulberry House and the Four Wantz roundabout on the A414 Chelmsford-bound. However, Essex Police's senior traffic management officer, Adam Pipe, deemed lowering the speed limit "inappropriate, as drivers would feel  is not adequate and would not comply".

Bus
The main destinations served by buses are Brentwood, Chelmsford, Harlow and Epping. Routes are operated by Arriva Shires & Essex, First Essex, Trustybus, Stephensons of Essex and SM Coaches. Epping Ongar Railway also operate a limited number of heritage bus services between Ongar and North Weald and also Epping on weekends and Bank Holidays.

Railway

Since the closure of the Central Line branch between Epping and Ongar in 1994, there is no longer a commuter train service to/from the town. The Epping Ongar Railway operates steam and diesel heritage services on the former Central line track, from North Weald Station on Saturdays, Sundays and Bank Holidays every hour to Ongar Station. It first operated (Sundays and Holidays only) between 2004 and 2007, and then after refurbishment again with the additional Saturday trains from May 2012.

The nearest London Underground station to the town is Epping, 7 miles away, the terminus of the Central line. The closest railway station is Brentwood, also 7 miles away, which is now served by the Elizabeth line. Harlow Town Station, a National Rail station operated by Abellio Greater Anglia, is 9 miles to the north west.

In popular culture
On The Who album Live at Leeds, drummer Keith Moon refers to Chipping Ongar in a bit of stage banter as part of the introduction to their so-called 'mini-opera', "A Quick One, While He's Away".

The endgame of Will Self's The Book of Dave takes place in Chipping Ongar.

In Adrian Edmondson's book How to Be a Complete Bastard, in the section on "How to be a Bastard to Japanese Tourists" he says "tell them all of London's tourist attractions are within walking distance of Ongar Tube".

In the BBC series Just Good Friends, Penny's mother and father live in Chipping Ongar.

YouTube personality Lewis Brindley, co-founder of The Yogscast, was born in Chipping Ongar, in 1983.

The headquarters of the minor political party the English Democrats is located here.

Twinning
  Cerizay (France)

Sources

References

External links
 The Ongar Millennium History Society

 
Towns in Essex
Market towns in Essex
Former civil parishes in Essex
Epping Forest District